The Deir el-Balah Governorate, also referred to as Central Gaza Governorate is one of 16 Governorates of Palestine in the central Gaza Strip which is administered by Palestine aside from its border with Israel, airspace and maritime territory. Its total land area consists of 56 sq. kilometers. According to the Palestinian Central Bureau of Statistics, in mid-year 2006 it had a population of 208,716 inhabitants distributed between eight localities.

Localities

Cities
 Deir al-Balah

Municipalities
 az-Zawayda

Village councils
 al-Musaddar
 Wadi as-Salqa

Refugee camps
 Bureij
 Deir al-Balah camp
 Maghazi
 Nuseirat

External links 

 
Governorates of the Palestinian National Authority in the Gaza Strip